A Walking Tour of the Shambles (Little Walks For Sightseers #16) (2002), written by Neil Gaiman and Gene Wolfe, is a novel in the form of a tour guide concerning a fictional part of Chicago called 'The Shambles'. It guides the reader through such non-existent landmarks as The House of Clocks (see the official website), Cereal House (home of the Terribly Strange Bed), and Gavagan's Irish Saloon. A collaboration between Neil Gaiman and Gene Wolfe (cover by Gahan Wilson, with interior illustrations by Randy Broecker and Earl Geier), it was published with two different covers by the American Fantasy Press (one crediting "Gaiman and Wolfe", the other crediting "Wolfe and Gaiman").
Although Chicago doesn't have a Shambles, Philadelphia, for instance, does.

References

2002 British novels
Collaborative novels
American fantasy novels
Novels by Neil Gaiman
Novels by Gene Wolfe
Novels set in Chicago